FEBS Open Bio is a monthly peer-reviewed open access scientific journal covering research and education in molecular and cellular life sciences. It was established in 2011 and is published by John Wiley & Sons on behalf of the Federation of European Biochemical Societies (FEBS). According to the journal, papers are not to be excluded on the basis of lack of perceived importance.

Articles originally submitted to other FEBS journals (FEBS Letters, The FEBS Journal, and Molecular Oncology) can be transferred to this journal with their original reviewer reports, without the need to resubmit or reformat the manuscript.

Abstracting and indexing
The journal is abstracted and indexed in:
 BIOSIS Previews
 Embase
 Scopus
 Science Citation Index Expanded
According to the Journal Citation Reports, the journal has a 2015 impact factor of 2.101, ranking it 197th out of 289 journals in the category "Biochemistry & Molecular Biology".

References

External links

Molecular and cellular biology journals
Monthly journals
Publications established in 2011
Wiley (publisher) academic journals
English-language journals